Steve Dubbeldam is a Canadian-American entrepreneur, adventurer, and fashion designer.

History 
Steve Dubbeldam co-founded the denim company Iron Army in 2004. In 2008, Dubbeldam co-founded City of Others denim company. In 2012, Dubbeldam co-founded Darling magazine.

Wilderness Collective 
In 2011, Dubbeldam founded Wilderness Collective, a Los Angeles-based adventure company. In 2015, Charles Fleming of the LA Times wrote that "founder Steve Dubbeldam aims to get guys out of their comfort zone so they can experience something epic."

References

External links 
Wilderness Collective

Year of birth missing (living people)
Living people
Canadian fashion designers
Outdoor recreation in the United States
Mountain guides
Adventure travel